The following lists events that happened during 1891 in South Africa.

Incumbents
 Governor of the Cape of Good Hope and High Commissioner for Southern Africa:Henry Brougham Loch.
 Governor of the Colony of Natal: Charles Bullen Hugh Mitchell.
 State President of the Orange Free State: Francis William Reitz.
 State President of the South African Republic: Paul Kruger.
 Prime Minister of the Cape of Good Hope: Cecil John Rhodes.

Events

January
 12 – Mahatma Gandhi passes the Bar examination in England.

June
 11 – Britain and Portugal agree on territory in East Africa at the Anglo-Portuguese Convention in Lisbon.

Births

Deaths

Railways

Railway lines opened
 10 February – Transvaal – Roodepoort to Krugersdorp, .
 7 April – Natal – Newcastle to Charlestown, .
 28 December – Transvaal – Mozambique border near Komatipoort to Malelane, .

Locomotives
Cape
Two new  locomotive types enter service on the Cape Government Railways (CGR):
 Two Baldwin-built 1st Class 2-6-0 Mogul type locomotives, the first American locomotives in South Africa.
 Thirty  4-6-0 tender locomotives in mainline service on all three Cape Systems.

Natal
 The Natal Government Railways places five   saddle-tank locomotives in service as shunting engines.

Transvaal
 The Nederlandsche-Zuid-Afrikaansche Spoorweg-Maatschappij (NZASM) places the first of twenty-four 19 Tonner  tank steam locomotives in service.

Sports

Rugby
 The first tour of the British and Irish Lions to South Africa takes place. The touring side presents the Currie Cup to Griqualand West, the province that produces the best performance on the tour.
 30 July – The Springbok Rugby team plays its first international test match against the Lions team of the British Isles and win by 4–0.

References

History of South Africa